In America: The Story of the Soul Sisters is a 2010 Nigerian American film directed by Rahman Oladigbolu and starring Jimmy Jean-Louis and Roger Dillingham Jr. It won the Best Film by an African Living Abroad award at the 7th Africa Movie Academy Awards and the Best Emerging Filmmaker's Award at the 2010 Roxbury International Film Festival in Boston Massachusetts.

References

External links
In America: The Story of the Soul Sisters at the Internet Movie Database

Nigerian drama films
2010 films
2010s English-language films
English-language Nigerian films